Blazing Barriers is a 1937 American drama film directed by Aubrey Scotto and written by Edwin C. Parsons and Lee Freeman. The film stars Junior Coghlan, Edward Arnold Jr., Florine McKinney, Irene Franklin, Guy Bates Post and Milburn Stone. The film was released on July 4, 1937, by Monogram Pictures.

Plot
The story follows hoods Tommy McGrath and "Fats" Moody, who are sent to a Civilian Conservation Corps camp in order to get them away from their criminal path.

Cast          
Junior Coghlan as Tommy McGrath 
Edward Arnold Jr. as Percival Throckmorton 'Fats' Moody
Florine McKinney as Joan Martin
Irene Franklin as Fleurette Varden
Guy Bates Post as Reginald Burley
Milburn Stone as Joe Waters
Jack Randall as Arthur Forsythe 
Dick Hogan as CCC Boy
Herbert Corthell as Sheriff Martin
Mary Hayes as Sales Clerk
Frank Bischell 
Cliff Carpenter 
Al Taylor as Thug

References

External links
 

1937 films
American adventure drama films
Monogram Pictures films
Films directed by Aubrey Scotto
1930s adventure drama films
American black-and-white films
1937 drama films
1930s English-language films
1930s American films